Huz or HUZ may refer to:
 Huizhou Pingtan Airport, in Guangdong, China
 Hunzib language, spoken in Dagestan, Russia
 Ihor Huz (born 1982), Ukrainian politician

See also